IHF President's Development Award is awarded by the International Handball Federation to its member federations for the spread and development of handball in their own countries and/or through the world. It is awarded by the IHF President or his representative every two year at the IHF Congress.

History
The IHF President’s Development Award is awarded to IHF member federations. It is granted to two Member Federations every two years at the IHF Congress. Formerly it is known as the Hans Baumann Trophy until 2015.

It is awarded for particular services to the development and spread of handball in the Member Federations’ own countries and/or throughout the world. The recipients are selected and the award granted by the IHF Council at the recommendation of the IHF Executive Committee. After invitation by the IHF, Member Federations may submit a completed IHF questionnaire no later than six months before the Congress.

The Member Federations receiving the award are given a diploma and a small replica of the award. The IHF President’s Development Award is granted to two applicants on two levels: 
 Handball developed countries
 Emerging federations

Award winners

Handball developed countries
Following is the list of winners of IHF President's Development Award for Handball developed countries:

Emerging federations
Following is the list of winners of IHF President's Development Award for Handball emerging federations:

External links
 IHF Statuts Chapter XXI - Regulations of Awards

International Handball Federation awards